Landgrave Louis IV of Hesse-Marburg (27 May 1537 – 9 October 1604) was the son of Landgrave Philip I of Hesse and his wife Christine of Saxony.  After the death of his father in 1567, Hesse was divided among his sons and Louis received Hesse-Marburg (Upper Hesse) including Marburg and Giessen.

Louis received his education at the court of Duke Christoph of Württemberg.  He had the Marburg Castle renovated by his architect Ebert Baldewein.  Wanting to enlarge his territory peacefully, he bought parts of the Fuldischen Mark in 1570 from the counts of Nassau-Saarbrücken and the rest in 1583 from the count of Nassau-Weilburg.

On 10 May 1563 he married Hedwig of Württemberg and his second marriage was to Marie, Countess of Mansfeld.  When he died in 1604 he left no heirs.  His 1597 will bequeathed his territory between his nephew, Maurice of Hesse-Kassel and Louis V of Hesse-Darmstadt, on the condition that it would remain Lutheran.

Ancestry

Further reading
 Rudersdorf, Manfred. Ludwig IV. Landgraf von Hessen-Marburg 1537-1604, 

1537 births
1604 deaths
House of Hesse-Marburg